Mordecai "Mordy" Bromberg SC (born 22 January 1959) is an Australian judge who was appointed to the Federal Court of Australia in 2009. He was previously a senior barrister, and in his youth also played four seasons of Australian rules football for the St Kilda Football Club.

Early life 
Bromberg was born in Israel in 1959 and arrived in Australia with his family in 1967, shortly before the Six-Day War. His father became a supermarket proprietor in Melbourne. He was educated at Brighton Road State School, Elsternwick State School, Elwood College, and Brighton Grammar School.

Football
After playing junior football at Brighton East, Bromberg began playing for St Kilda Football Club in the Victorian Football League (VFL) under-19 competition. He made his senior debut in the first round of the 1978 VFL season, against Fitzroy. He played 12 games in his first year, but lost his spot in the team in 1979 and fell out with coach Mike Patterson. Bromberg played the rest of the season with the all-Jewish AJAX Football Club in the Victorian Amateur Football Association (VAFA). He requested a clearance to Richmond at the end of 1979 but it was refused. Returning to St Kilda, he played 16 games in 1980 and four in 1981. He was released by the club at the end of the season after a career total of 34 VFL games. In 1982, he played one final season of football for Camberwell in the VFA.

Career
Bromberg combined his football career with law studies at Monash University. He graduated with a Bachelor of Economics and a Bachelor of Laws. He was admitted to the Victorian Bar in 1988. Prior to the 2001 federal election, he unsuccessfully contested Australian Labor Party (ALP) preselection for the Division of Burke. He was defeated by Brendan O'Connor, who went on to win the seat. Bromberg was appointed Senior Counsel (SC) in 2003 and was President of the Australian Institute of Employment Rights.

Bromberg's appointment to the Federal Court of Australia commenced on 7 December 2009. He presided in Eatock v Bolt in the Federal Court, in which columnist Andrew Bolt was found to be in breach of Section 18C of the Racial Discrimination Act.

In a 2021 case, Sharma v Minister for the Environment, Bromberg ruled that the federal Minister for the Environment had a duty of care, arising from the law of negligence, to protect children from climate change when considering whether to approve projects under the Environment Protection and Biodiversity Conservation Act 1999. Bromberg did not grant the injunction sought by the plaintiffs, a group of teenagers, who sought to bar the minister from approving an extension to the Vickery coal mine owned by Whitehaven Coal. Bromberg's ruling was subsequently unanimously overturned on appeal by the Full Bench of the Federal Court of Australia; Chief Justice James Allsop arguing government policy should be determined by the government and not by the courts.

See also
List of Judges of the Federal Court of Australia

References

External links

1959 births
Living people
People educated at Brighton Grammar School
Monash Law School alumni
Australian Jews
VFL/AFL players born outside Australia
Australian Senior Counsel
Israeli emigrants to Australia
Jewish Israeli sportspeople
Judges of the Federal Court of Australia
Australian rules footballers from Melbourne
St Kilda Football Club players
Camberwell Football Club players
Judges from Melbourne